The Belfort Synagogue is a synagogue built in the Byzantine Revival architecture during the Second French Empire in the city center of Belfort, France.

The building was erected in 1857 and was put on the list of National heritage site in October 1983.

The Jewish community exists in the town since the 13th century. Today the synagogue is active although the Jewish community is very small.

An old Jewish cemetery from 1811 still exists today.

Gallery

References 

Ashkenazi synagogues
Synagogues in France
Byzantine Revival architecture in France
Neoclassical architecture in France
History of Franche-Comté
Byzantine Revival synagogues
Ashkenazi Jewish culture in France
Jewish French history
Jewish German history
Buildings and structures in Belfort
Buildings and structures in the Territoire de Belfort
Synagogues completed in 1857
1857 establishments in France
Monuments historiques of Bourgogne-Franche-Comté